The brown-banded rail (Lewinia mirifica) is a species of bird in the family Rallidae.
It is endemic to the Philippines, known from Luzon and Samar. Details about its life and breeding are not known. Its habitat is listed to be cloudforest, near pine forest and undisturbed river swamp and is found at 500–2,250 meters. It is largely known from migration records of 200 sightings from 1965 to 1970 at Dalton Pass so it is thought to be migratory. The most recent sighting was in 2001 and the call is described as "frog-like accelerating series of clicking notes". The threats are not exactly known but it has been and is continuing to be hunted at Dalton Pass.

References

brown-banded rail
Endemic birds of the Philippines
Birds of Luzon
Fauna of Samar
brown-banded rail
brown-banded rail
Taxonomy articles created by Polbot